Forest Abbey or Vorst Abbey was a Benedictine abbey located in the Brussels municipality of Forest, Belgium. It was founded in 1105 and existed for nearly 700 years, until its partial destruction by fire in 1764. It was abolished in 1796. Only the abbey's 18th-century outbuildings have been preserved. They are now owned by the municipality and serve as a cultural centre.

History

The abbots of Affligem Abbey, which had been the ecclesiastical owners of the parish since the Bishop of Cambrai ceded it to them in 1105, decided to build a priory for women in Forest, which would eventually become Forest Abbey. The first prioress was named in 1239. Also in the 13th century, the Romanesque Church of St. Denis was rebuilt in the newer Gothic style. The neighbouring abbey church was rebuilt in the 15th century.

Relics of Saint Alena, whose cult was popular in the region, were formerly kept both in the parish church and in the abbey church, but since 1796 only in the parish church.

Much of the abbey was destroyed by fire on 26 March 1764. The abbey was suppressed on 8 October 1796 and sold the following year. The buildings that survived the dismantling are now owned by the Brussels municipality of Forest, and are used as a cultural centre for seminars, banquets and exhibitions. The abbey and the site were classified as a historic monument in 1994.

Abbesses

 Petronella, daughter of Zeger, castellan of Ghent, installed 9 May 1239
 Heylwide de Bouterstin, abbess 1260–1294
 Marie de Clebben
 Machtild van Asse
 Aleydis van Pollar
 Clarisse van Cattendyck
 Catherine de Beaufort
 Catherine van Keisterbeke
 Marguerite van Bouynes
 Yolenta van Ysche, died 2 February 1341
 Jeanne van Huesdem, elected 14 March 1341
 Isabelle de Massemyn, died 6 December 1384
 Aleyde de Goer, elected 6 December 1385, died 29 December 1385
 Marie de Trazegnies, elected 27 November 1386, died 14 October 1388
 Marie Sconinckx, elected 14 October 1388, died 6 September 1418
 Catherine van Magdeghem, elected 7 September 1418, died 10 September 1430
 Elizabeth Sconinckx, elected 19 February 1430, died 19 August 1457
 Marguerite van Schoers, elected 20 July 1458, died 1489
 Catherine van Bouchout, died at Utrecht on 6 October 1498
 Barbe van Leaucourt, resigned, died at Anderlecht in 1516
 Margareta van Liedekerke, transferred from the Abbey of Ghislenghien to reform Forest Abbey; arrived 24 July 1500; re-established discipline and good order, died 25 September 1541
 Marguerite van Liedekerke, niece of previous, died 19 May 1560
 Françoise de la Douve, died 3 April 1583, during disruptions of the Dutch Revolt: community lived as refugees in Dendermonde and Brussels from 1578; abbey burnt down by rebels in 1582
 Adrienne du Petit-Cambrai, appointed by royal letters patent, installed 27 September 1587, rebuilt the monastery, died 6 November 1608
 Maria de Taye, 25th abbess, installed 29 January 1609; died 29 July 1637
 Françoise de Bette, 26th abbess, installed 25 July 1638; died 29 August 1666
 Catherine Quarré, installed 12 September 1667; died 1 September 1668
 Dorothée Christine d'Yves, installed 12 January 1670, died 15 October 1692
 Agnes Scholastica de Riviere d'Arschot, great niece of Françoise de Bette, elected 18 January 1693; died 19 February 1712
 During a five-year vacancy the abbey was governed by the prioress, Florence van Eyck
 Marie-Josephe d'Espinosa, installed 22 December 1716; died 8 January 1743
 Jeanne-Thérèse de Roissin, consecrated 9 June 1743; died 27 December 1756
 Françoise de Landas, installed 26 April 1757, died 27 July 1760
 Marie-Josephe de Bouzies, 33rd abbess, installed 19 October 1760
 Juana Francisca de Rueda de Conteras, last abbess 1785–1796

References

Notes

Christian monasteries in Brussels
Benedictine monasteries in Belgium
1100s establishments in the Holy Roman Empire
1105 establishments in Europe
12th-century establishments in Belgium
1796 disestablishments in the Southern Netherlands
Forest, Belgium